The 2007 IFSC Climbing World Cup was held in 18 locations. Bouldering competitions were held in 7 locations, lead in 8 locations, and speed in 6 locations. The season began on 30 March in Erlangen, Germany and concluded on 18 November in Kranj, Slovenia.

The top 3 in each competition received medals, and the overall winners were awarded trophies. At the end of the season an overall ranking was determined based upon points, which athletes were awarded for finishing in the top 30 of each individual event.

The winners for bouldering were Kilian Fischhuber and Juliette Danion, for lead Patxi Usobiaga Lakunza and Maja Vidmar, for speed Sergei Sinitcyn and Tatiana Ruyga, and for combined Jorg Verhoeven and Natalija Gros, men and women respectively.
The National Team for bouldering was France, for lead France, and for speed Russian Federation.

Highlights of the season 
In bouldering, at the World Cup in Réunion, Juliette Danion of France flashed all boulders in the final round to take the win.

In speed climbing, Russian athletes, Sergei Sinitcyn and Tatiana Ruyga clinched the overall titles of the season for men and women respectively, making it double speed titles for Russia.

Overview

References

External links 

IFSC Climbing World Cup
2007 in sport climbing